The Goromuru River is a river, located in the Northern Territory in Australia.

The headwaters are found in the valleys of the Frederick Hills in Arnhem Land and flow in a northerly direction through uninhabited country for a distance of  until discharging into Arnhem Bay and eventually the Arafura Sea.

The estuary formed at the river mouth is tidal in nature and in near pristine condition. It is tide dominated in nature having a single channel and is surrounded by an area of  covered with mangroves.

See also

List of rivers of Northern Territory

References

Rivers of the Northern Territory
Arnhem Land